"Pop That Thang" is a 1972 funk song released by The Isley Brothers on their T-Neck imprint. Co-written by the three Isley brothers: O'Kelly, Rudolph and Ronald, Howard Kelly and Clive Otis, the song is an uptempo dance number that was featured on the group's 1972 album, Brother, Brother, Brother. A successful record, it reached #3 on the national R&B charts and #24 on the pop singles chart. Billboard ranked it as the No. 100 song for 1972.

Credits
Ronald Isley: lead vocals
O'Kelly Isley, Jr. and Rudolph Isley: background vocals
Ernie Isley: guitar, drums
Marvin Isley: bass
Chris Jasper: piano, keyboards
Produced by The Isley Brothers

References

1972 singles
The Isley Brothers songs
Songs written by O'Kelly Isley Jr.
Songs written by Rudolph Isley
Songs written by Ronald Isley
T-Neck Records singles